Holorusia hespera, the giant western crane fly, is a species of crane fly in the family Tipulidae. It is found in western North America.

References

External links

 

Tipulidae
Diptera of North America
Insects described in 1990